David Squires is an Australian cartoonist, whose work appears in The Guardian, L'Équipe and other publications.

Work
Squires's first published work was in the Swindon Town fanzine, The 69er, as a teenager, about Duncan Shearer's departure from Swindon Town to Blackburn Rovers in 1992.

During his time in England, Squires was commissioned to design Rockin' Robin, Swindon Town's mascot. He also designed Herbie the Hammer, a West Ham United mascot.

His book The Illustrated History of Football was published by Penguin in 2016. In May 2017, Squires began a weekly strip covering the UK general election for The Guardian.

Personal life
Squires relocated from London, England, to Sydney, Australia, in 2009. He announced in November 2022 that he had become an Australian citizen.

Books 
 The Illustrated History of Football (2016)
 The Illustrated History of Football: Hall of Fame (2017)

References

External links
Official website

1974 births
Living people
Australian cartoonists
Australian comics artists
Australian comics writers
Australian illustrators
Australian satirists
English cartoonists
English comics artists
English comics writers
English illustrators
English satirists
People from Swindon
The Guardian people